Mangajou is a village in the commune of Sada on Mayotte.

Populated places in Mayotte